"Sappy" is a song by the American rock band, Nirvana.

Sappy may also refer to:
 Sappy (EP), by South Korean girl group Red Velvet
 Sappy Records, an independent record label in Sackville, New Brunswick, Canada